Manglia Gaon railway station is a (station code: MGG) is one of the local railway stations in Indore City. The railway station of Manglia Gaon is located on a broad gauge line. Its route is connected with Ujjain Junction to the northwest, Indore Junction to the south, Dewas Junction to the north. It is connected to Bhopal, Ujjain, Gwalior, Jaipur, Jabalpur, Ratlam.

Trains
The following trains stop at Manglia Gaon railway station:

19711/19712 Indore - Jaipur Express Via. Ajmer
18233/18234 Narmada Express between Indore and Bilaspur
59379/59380 Indore – Maksi Passenger (UnReserved)
59307/59308 Indore – Ujjain Passenger
79312/79311 Laxmibai Nagar - Ratlam DEMU
59388/59388 Indore - Nagda Passenger (UnReserved)
79305/79305 Ratlam - Indore DMU

See also 
 Indore Junction
 Ujjain Junction

References 

Railway stations in Indore district
Ratlam railway division
Year of establishment missing